The Royal Zoological Society of Scotland is a learned society and registered charity based in Edinburgh, Scotland. It was founded by Thomas Haining Gillespie in 1909. In 1913, Edinburgh Town Council bought a large plot of land on Corstorphine Hill for the society - this later opened to the public as Edinburgh Zoo. The society received its Royal Charter in 1913. The principal objective of the society mentioned in the original charter is:
To promote, facilitate and encourage the study of zoology and kindred subjects and to foster and develop amongst the people an interest in and knowledge of animal life.

In 1986, the society acquired the Highland Wildlife Park in Kingussie, Inverness-shire.

See also
History of Edinburgh Zoo
List of organisations in the United Kingdom with a royal charter
List of zoo associations
Office of the Scottish Charity Regulator
Scottish Wildlife Trust

References

External links

British biology societies
Zoological societies
1909 establishments in Scotland
Charities based in Edinburgh
Nature conservation in Scotland
Zoolog
Science and technology in Scotland
Professional associations based in Scotland
Scientific organizations established in 1909
Learned societies of Scotland
Scientific organisations based in the United Kingdom